The 2018 Mesterfinalen was the second edition of Mesterfinalen and the 4th Norwegian super cup overall. Mesterfinalen is the annual game between the League champions and the Cup champions in Norway, or the second-placed team in Eliteserien if the same team are both reigning League and Cup champions. The final was played on 26 April between league champions and defending Mesterfinalen champions Rosenborg and the Cup champions Lillestrøm. The match was due to be played 5 March, but due to weather conditions it was moved to 26 April.

Rosenborg won the final with the score 0–1. After a goalless first half, Nicklas Bendtner scored the winning goal in the 52nd minute.

Match details

References

Mesterfinalen
Mesterfinalen 2018
Mesterfinalen 2018
Mesterfinalen